The following is a list of Michigan State Historic Sites in Bay County, Michigan. Sites marked with a dagger (†) are also listed on the National Register of Historic Places in Bay County, Michigan.


Current listings

See also
 National Register of Historic Places listings in Bay County, Michigan

Sources
 Historic Sites Online – Bay County. Michigan State Housing Developmental Authority. Accessed January 23, 2011.

References

Bay County
State Historic Sites
Tourist attractions in Bay County, Michigan